is a train station located in Kurume, Fukuoka, Japan.

Lines
Nishi-Nippon Railroad
Amagi Line

Platforms

Adjacent stations

Surrounding area 
 Kaneshima Nursery
 Kaneshima Elementary School
 Kaneshima Post Office
 Kumashiro Hospital

Railway stations in Fukuoka Prefecture
Railway stations in Japan opened in 1921